Attorney General Horne may refer to:

Thomas Horne (politician) (1800–1870), Attorney-General of Tasmania
Tom Horne (born 1945), Attorney General of Arizona
William Horne (Liberal politician) (1774–1860), Attorney General for England and Wales